Teori Albino Zavascki (15 August 1948 – 19 January 2017) was a Brazilian judge who served as a Minister of the Superior Court of Justice from 8 May 2003 until 29 November 2012, appointed by President Luiz Inácio Lula da Silva, and as a Minister of the Supreme Federal Court of Brazil from 29 November 2012 until his death on 19 January 2017, having been appointed to the position by President Dilma Rousseff. At the time of his death he was the justice in charge of the trials resulting from Operation Car Wash.

Death 

Zavascki was killed in an air disaster in Paraty, Rio de Janeiro around 2:00 PM (16:00 GMT) on Thursday, 19 January 2017. Official enquiries into the crash began on 20 January and the cockpit voice recorder was recovered. More than two hundred politicians and business people were possibly implicated in a graft scheme that Zavascki was investigating.

Final Investigation Results 
On 22 January 2018, the Aeronautical Accidents Investigation and Prevention Center (Centro de Investigação e Prevenção de Accidentes Aeronáuticos, CENIPA) presented their final report. The conclusion was that there was no shortage of kerosene.  Apparently the accident was caused by three major factors:
 Bad visual climate conditions. At the time of the accident, the horizontal visibility was 1500 meters and the rainfall was 25 mm/h.
 Cultural practices of the pilots: the investigations found that several pilots who fly in this region rely heavily on their experience and don't follow strict security procedures, including informal practices which inhibit an adequate analysis of the risks involved in this specific landing procedure.
 Spatial disorientation: as a consequence of the bad visibility, the flight curve executed, the low level above the sea and the stress of the pilot, he probably lost control of the plane.

References

|-

Judges

1948 births
2017 deaths
People from Santa Catarina (state)
Brazilian people of Polish descent
Supreme Federal Court of Brazil justices
21st-century judges
Victims of aviation accidents or incidents in Brazil